The 1978 European Women Basketball Championship, commonly called EuroBasket Women 1978, was the 16th regional championship held by FIBA Europe. The competition was held in Poland and took place from 20 May to 30 May 1978.  won the gold medal and  the silver medal while  won the bronze.

First stage

Group A

Group B

Group C

Second stage

Championship Group

8th to 13th Group

Final standings

External links 
 FIBA Europe profile
 Todor66 profile

1978
1978 in Polish women's sport
International women's basketball competitions hosted by Poland
May 1978 sports events in Europe
Euro